"Vacation" is a song by Danish pop band Alphabeat, released on 12 March 2012 as the lead single from their third studio album, Express Non-Stop (2012). The song was originally intended to be released in the United States on the same date, but due to "faults in the system", it was ultimately released on 26 March 2012. The song peaked at number fifteen on the Danish Singles Chart. Alphabeat performed "Vacation" live on the season five finale of the Danish version of X Factor on 23 March 2012.

Track listing
Digital download
"Vacation" – 2:54

Charts

Release history

References

2012 singles
2012 songs
Alphabeat songs
Copenhagen Records singles